Members of the 15th Lok Sabha were elected during the 2009 general election in India. It was dissolved on 18 May 2014 by President Pranab Mukherjee.

Indian National Congress-led United Progressive Alliance won 44 more seats than the previous 14th Lok Sabha. The next 16th Lok Sabha was convened after 2014 Indian general election.

The Second Manmohan Singh ministry introduced a total of 222 Bills (apart from Finance and Appropriations Bills) in the 15th Lok Sabha. A total of 165 Bills were passed by the House, including bills introduced in previous Lok Sabhas.

14 sitting members from Rajya Sabha, the Upper House of Indian Parliament, were elected to 15th Lok Sabha after the 2009 Indian general election.

Bills
During the tenure of the 15th Lok Sabha, 71% of bills were referred to Parliamentary committees for examination

Members 

 Speaker: Meira Kumar, INC, Sasaram, Bihar
 Deputy Speaker: Kariya Munda, BJP, Khunti, Jharkhand
 Leader of the House: Pranab Mukherjee, INC, Jangipur, West Bengal (May, 2009 - 2012) (He went on to become the 13th President of India in 2012) 
Sushil Kumar Shinde, INC, Solapur, Maharashtra (2012 - May, 2014)
 Leader of the Opposition: Sushma Swaraj, BJP, Vidisha, Madhya Pradesh
Secretary General:
P.D.T. Achary
T. K. Viswanathan

Number of members by the alliance in Lok Sabha

Members of the 15th Lok Sabha by political party and alliance:

List of members by political party
Members by political party in 15th Lok Sabha are given below-

Cabinet

United Progressive Alliance Cabinet by party
Source: Various news organisations
The new United Progressive Alliance (UPA) included 79 members, 78 members in the cabinet plus Prime Minister Manmohan Singh. The first 20 cabinet ministers including Manmohan Singh, swore in on 22 May 2009, while the other 59 cabinet members swore in on 27 May 2009. The 5 non-Congress cabinet ministers, include M.K. Azhagiri from the DMK. Mukul Roy from Trinamool Congress, Sharad Pawar from Nationalist Congress Party, and Farooq Abdullah from National Conference represent the other non-Congress cabinet ministers.

United Progressive Alliance cabinet by states
Source: The Hindu

 MoS (I) – Ministers of State with Independent charge

By-Elections
 In November 2009, Raj Babbar of Indian National Congress got elected from Firozabad, Uttar Pradesh. Seat was vacant as Akhilesh Yadav of Samajwadi Party resigned from this seat keeping the Kannauj Seat as he had contested from both and had to drop one seat.
 On 13 May 2011, Y.S. Jaganmohan Reddy of YSR Congress got elected from Kadapa, Andhra Pradesh. He resigned his seat when he resigned from Indian National Congress. He contested that seat again won by  votes. 
Elections were held on 13 October 2011 for the Hissar Lok Sabha seat due to the death of Bhajan Lal. The HJC-BJP alliance, represented by Kuldeep Bishnoi s/o Bhajan Lal, won the election.
On 3 May 2012, Akhilesh Yadav resigned from the Kannauj seat, to serve as Chief Minister of Uttar Pradesh, after Samajwadi Party won Assembly Elections. His wife, Dimple Yadav was elected unopposed from the seat in the bye-elections.
On 13 October 2012 results of by-elections to Tehri Garhwal (Lok Sabha constituency) in Uttarakhand and Jangipur (Lok Sabha constituency) in West Bengal were declared. The incumbent MP of Tehri Vijay Bahuguna had resigned upon being elected to the Uttarakhand Legislative assembly and becoming Chief Minister, while the MP from Jangipur, Pranab Mukherjee, had ceased to be an MP upon election as the President of India, thus necessitating the by-elections. In Tehri, Mala Rajya Laxmi Shah of BJP won the seat while Abhijit Mukherjee (son of Pranab Mukherjee) retained the Jangipur seat as Congress nominee.

References

External links

 Lok Sabha website
 List of winning candidates published by election commission of india on 17 May 2009.
 Tracking activity of MPs in Parliament

Further reading
 "A legislative history of the 15th Lok Sabha" – The Hindu (April 8, 2015)

 
Terms of the Lok Sabha
2009 establishments in India
2014 disestablishments in India